China Women's University is a women's university located in Chaoyang District of Beijing, China.  It also has a campus in Changping District of Beijing.

It was founded in 1949 as a school for the cadres of All-China Women's Federation.  The current name was adopted in 1995 and in 1996 it became a university.  Currently it has about 160 teachers and 3,300 undergraduate students. 
 
It used to have a branch campus in Shandong Province, which became Shandong Women's University in 2010.

External links
Website (in Chinese and English).

Universities and colleges in Beijing
Women's universities and colleges in China
Educational institutions established in 1949
1949 establishments in China
All-China Women's Federation
Schools in Chaoyang District, Beijing